Larry's Giant Subs is a fast-food submarine sandwich chain headquartered in Jacksonville, Florida. Their first store opened in Jacksonville, Florida in 1982.

History

Larry and Mitch Raikes built the first Larry's Giant Subs in Jacksonville, Florida in 1982. After seeing the response the first store received, the two brothers were inspired to branch out and take their concept nationwide.

See also
 List of submarine sandwich restaurants

References

External links
 Official web site

Companies based in Jacksonville, Florida
Restaurants in Florida
Economy of the Southeastern United States
Regional restaurant chains in the United States
Fast-food chains of the United States
Restaurants established in 1982
Submarine sandwich restaurants
1982 establishments in Florida